= The 'Cuse =

The 'Cuse may refer to

- Syracuse University
  - the Syracuse Orange athletic teams
- the city of Syracuse, New York
